Andy Paul is a Greek-Cypriot singer and songwriter. He represented Cyprus with the song "Anna Maria Lena" in the Eurovision Song Contest 1984 in Luxembourg.

At the Cyprus Eurovision national finals, Paul came in first, winning the spot to represent Cyprus at the international event.  Lia Vissi-Piliouri, Anna Vissi's sister, came in second at the event with the song "Htes".

History
Paul is a Greek Cypriot who immigrated to the UK in the early 1960s. He became a singer and songwriter influenced by artists such as Elvis. Cliff Richard, Tom Jones and Engelbert Humperdinck.

Paul started his career in a pub sponsored by Bob Whitley, singing in a talent contest. Encouraged by his friends and family to enter, he won first prize with his impersonation of his childhood idol Elvis Presley. His performance was so good, the Whitley Taverns gave him a contract. Paul went on to sing in top venues throughout the UK until his big hit with "Anna Mari-Elena". Although he was Greek, he had little contact with the Greek community; he was more of an English artist.

Andy Paul's first song was a simple melody entitled "Heartbreak Situation", produced by the now world-famous Stock, Aitken and Waterman. In the months that followed, a second release gave Paul his first big break – the song was "Anna Mari-Elena", which Andy wrote and entered in the Cypriot Eurovision Song Contest. The song went on to win the national contest, and was the entry for Cyprus in 1984. This was to be the first international hit for the Hit Factory. The next six years saw Paul touring extensively throughout Europe, gaining a following and many successes. In 1986 he released "Now That I Found You", an instant disco hit in Europe and in Greece.

Andy Paul has had all his success in Europe. After the 1984 Eurovision Song Contest, everything changed for Paul – he became a big star in the Greek music industry. He has supported big names such as Demis Roussos at the Royal Festival Hall, and worked with others in Greece and Cyprus.

Discography

 Anna Mari-Elena (Greek)
 Anemona (Greek)
 An Tin This (Greek)
 Atelioti Agapi (Greek)
 An Anakalipso (Greek)
 A Piece of Heaven
 Bai Bai Bai (Greek)
 Berasmenes Mou Agapes (Greek)
 Boso Mou Lipis Mana (Greek)
 Boys Don't Cry
 Boso Mou Lipis Mana (Greek)
 Broto Fili (Greek)
 Boso Mou Lipis Mana (Greek)
 Bos (Greek)
 Bou Tha Bas (Greek)
 Broto Fili (Greek)
 Bring Back The Sunshine
 Change
 Clubland
 Could This Be Love
 Darling If You Leave Me
 Don't Be Disrespectful To Me
 Domino (Greek)
 Ego Fteo (Greek)
 Epetios (Greek)
 Follow Your Heart
 Genithike Ena Star (Greek)
 Glikia Melodia (Greek)
 Happy Anniversary
 Hanese (Greek)
 Hearbreak Situation
 Home Is Where The Heart Is
 How Do I Go On
 How Do I Let Go
 I Believe
 I Bortes Oles Klisane (Greek)
 I Karthies Bou Bonane (Greek)
 I'm Leaving You
 I'm Not A Casanova
 I'm so Sad
 Ime THikosou (Greek)
 Infinity
 I Owe It All To You
 It's Up To You And Me
 I Will Go On
 I Was Lonely Maria
 I Will Go On
 I zoi (Greek)
 Katazitite (Greek)
 Karthiamou (Greek)
 Karthihtipia Sta Thrania (Greek)
 Kalokeri (Greek)
 Keely
 Kiomos (Greek)
 Kratame (Greek)
 Ksenomania (Greek)
 Let's Pretend
 Long Distance Call To Heaven
 Loulouthia Afthona (Greek)
 Mia Gineka (Greek)
 Min Alaksis Bote (Greek)
 Mono Esi (Greek)
 Mystery
 My First Big Rodeo
 My Little Home
 Never The Winner
 Never Never Before
 Nostalgic
 Now That I found You
 Oh Baby
 On The Inside
 Oli Mazi (Greek)
 Ohi (Greek)
 Only Dreams
 One Way Journey
 Oti Ke Na Bis (Greek)
 Oti Ke Na Gini (Greek)
 Oxigono (Greek)
 Pour Me A Last One
 Ptisi 623 (Greek)
 Rendezvous (Greek)
 Save Me
 Se Anazito (Greek)
 Sorry Sandy
 So Hard
 Skotosame Ena Erota (Greek)
 Tetio Thilima (Greek)
 The Magic of Xmas
 Then Ipan Ne (Greek)
 This Is My Moment
 Then Boro (Greek)
 To Telefteo Sou Grama( Greek)
 To Thromaki (Greek)
 Together Forever
 Vacationing Lovers
 Walk on By
 When I Look into Your Eyes
 Why Lord
 Why Did You Break My Heart
 Zoi Se Emena Fernis Thistihia (Greek)

References

Living people
Cypriot pop singers
Eurovision Song Contest entrants of 1984
Cypriot male  singer-songwriters
20th-century Cypriot male singers
Eurovision Song Contest entrants for Cyprus
Year of birth missing (living people)
Cypriot emigrants to the United Kingdom